Jones Knowles Ritchie (JKR) is a creative agency based in London, New York, Singapore and Shanghai.

History 

JKR was founded in 1990 by Joe Jones, Andrew Knowles and Ian Ritchie.

After 22 years in London, the agency expanded to the United States in 2012, with Sara Hyman founding JKR New York. This was followed by the creation of JKR Singapore in 2013 by Emily Kousah and Katie Ewer and JKR Shanghai in 2015 by Rene Chen and Yolanda Tang. In 2016, JKR acquired Glassick Brands to expand their Singapore offering.

References

Design companies of the United Kingdom
Digital marketing companies of the United Kingdom
British companies established in 1990